William Tuttle may refer to:

William J. Tuttle (1912–2007), American make-up artist
William M. Tuttle Jr. (born 1937), American author and historian
William P. Tuttle (1847–1924), financier and entrepreneur
William E. Tuttle Jr. (1870–1923), U.S. Representative from New Jersey
William G. T. Tuttle Jr. (1935–2020), retired U.S. Army general 
William Jeremiah Tuttle (1882–1930) aka Bill Tuttle American Olympic freestyle swimmer and water polo player

See also
Bill Tuttle, American professional baseball player